Kaiserliche Werften were government-owned shipyards which were responsible for the construction and repair of warships of the Prussian Navy from 1871 to 1920. They were also responsible for the design and construction of a small number of aircraft for the German Navy during World War I

There were three Kaiserliche Werften:

 Kaiserliche Werft Danzig
 Kaiserliche Werft Kiel
 Kaiserliche Werft Wilhelmshaven